Scott Hocknull (born 1977) is a vertebrate palaeontologist and Senior Curator in Geology at the Queensland Museum in Brisbane. He was the 2002 recipient of the Young Australian of the Year Award.

He is the youngest Australian to date to hold a museum curatorship and has described and named 10 new species and four new genera.

Early life
Scott Hocknull was born in Adelaide, South Australia. His family moved to Brisbane when he was 12. He enrolled in a B.Sc. at the University of Queensland in 1996, majoring in zoology and geology. He took his degree with Honours in 2000.

Career 
Hocknull worked at the Queensland Museum during his university studies. After graduation he became a curator in geosciences at the Queensland Museum. He became senior curator in 2002.

He took his doctorate from the University of New South Wales, in 2009.

In cooperation with the original finder Robyn Mackenzie, Hocknull published the description of Australotitan cooperensis.

Awards 
 Young Australian of the Year for Queensland, 2002
 National and Queensland Career Achiever, 2002
 Queensland Science and Technology Achiever, 2002
 National Career Achiever, 2002
 Centenary Medalist, 2003
 Neville Stephens Medal, Geological Society of Australia, 2005
 Riversleigh Medal, 2009
 Queensland's best and brightest - The Courier Mail, 2009
 Rising Stars of Queensland Science, 2015
 10 Best of the Best of Queensland's 50 Top Thinkers, 2015

References

External links

Scott Hocknull profile at Queensland Museum

Living people
Australian paleontologists
People from Brisbane
Place of birth missing (living people)
1977 births